G3: Live in Denver is a live DVD of G3, the touring band in which Joe Satriani and Steve Vai invite another player to come tour with them. In 2003, Yngwie Malmsteen was the chosen one. Along with this DVD, a double-CD album was released, G3: Rockin' in the Free World. The DVD was recorded at the Fillmore Auditorium in Denver, on October 20, 2003. Despite the name on the DVD case, when played the title that appears on screen is "G3: Live from Denver" rather than "G3: Live in Denver".

Track listing

Joe Satriani
"Satch Boogie"
"The Extremist"
"Starry Night"
"Midnight"
"The Mystical Potato Head Groove Thing"

Steve Vai
"I Know You're Here"
"Juice"
"I'm the Hell Outta Here (feat. Tony Macalpine)"

Yngwie Malmsteen
"Evil Eye"
"Baroque 'n' Roll"
"Acoustic Guitar Solo"
"Adagio"
"Far Beyond the Sun"
"Amazing speed"

The G3 Jam
"Rockin' in the Free World" 
"Little Wing"
"Voodoo Child (Slight Return)"

Charts

Weekly charts

Certifications

References 

G3 (tour) albums

pt:G3: Live in Denver